Khamul is a genus of chalcid wasps known containing four species in Central and South America. The body and head is black, while the legs and antennae are brown individuals measure  in body length.

The name Khamûl is taken from a villain in J.R.R. Tolkien's novel The Lord of the Rings.

Species
 Khamul erwini is known from Costa Rica, Colombia, Ecuador and Brazil
 Khamul gothmogi is known from Ecuador and Peru
 Khamul lanceolatus is known from Costa Rica, Mexico, and Peru 
 Khamul tolkeini is known from Ecuador and Peru.

Notes

References

Eurytomidae
Hymenoptera of South America
Hymenoptera genera
Organisms named after Tolkien and his works